Robert Lee Sloan (January 1, 1889 – December 8, 1951) was an American Negro league outfielder between 1919 and 1921.

A native of Walnut Springs, Texas, Sloan made his Negro leagues debut in 1919 for the Brooklyn Royal Giants, and played for the club again in 1921. He died in Dallas, Texas in 1951 at age 62.

References

External links
 and Seamheads

1889 births
1951 deaths
Brooklyn Royal Giants players
Baseball outfielders
Baseball players from Texas
People from Bosque County, Texas
20th-century African-American people